Elections to the French National Assembly were held in French Cameroons on 17 June 1951.

Electoral system
The four seats allocated to the constituency were elected on two separate electoral rolls; French citizens elected one MP from the first college, whilst non-citizens elected three MPs in the second college, an increase from two seats in November 1946.

Results

First college

Second college

Seat 1

Seat 2

Seat 3

References

Cameroon
Elections in Cameroon
1951 in French Cameroon
Election and referendum articles with incomplete results
Cameroon